The 5th constituency of Somme is a French legislative constituency in the Somme département. Like the other 576 French constituencies, it elects one MP using the two-round system, with a run-off if no candidate receives over 50% of the vote in the first round.

Description
The 5th constituency of the Somme covers the largely rural west of the department.

Unlike the other constituencies in Somme the 5th has remained solidly conservative throughout the Fifth Republic.

Historic representation

Election results

2022

 
 
 
 
|-
| colspan="8" bgcolor="#E9E9E9"|
|-

2017

2012

2007

2002

 
 
 
 
 
 
 
|-
| colspan="8" bgcolor="#E9E9E9"|
|-

1997

 
 
 
 
 
 
|-
| colspan="8" bgcolor="#E9E9E9"|
|-

References
Official results of French elections from 2002: "Résultats électoraux officiels en France" (in French).
2007 results: 
2012 results: 

5